10 Hunter Street is a commercial building located at the corner of Hunter Street and Little Hunter Street, in the Sydney central business district, in the City of Sydney local government area of New South Wales, Australia. It was formerly The Grand Hotel (since relocated further east on Hunter Street) and NSW Sports Club (which closed in 2013). The property is privately owned. The building was added to the New South Wales State Heritage Register on 2 April 1999 udner the name Little Hunter and Hamilton Street Precinct. The heritage listed portion of the property includes the main building of 10 Hunter Street, extending to the rear frontage on Curtin Street, as well as the extension facing Little Hunter Street.

History

Description

Heritage listing 

The Little Hunter and Hamilton Street Precinct was listed on the New South Wales State Heritage Register on 2 April 1999.

References

Attribution

External links 

New South Wales State Heritage Register
Sydney central business district
Commercial buildings in New South Wales
Articles incorporating text from the New South Wales State Heritage Register